Ransoniella punctata, common name the brown-spotted cowry, is a species of sea snail, a cowry, a marine gastropod mollusk in the family Cypraeidae, the cowries.

Subspecies
Ransoniella punctata punctata (Linnaeus, 1771)
Ransoniella punctata berinii (Dautzenberg, 1906)
Ransoniella punctata trizonata (Sowerby III, 1870)

Description
The shell size varies between 7.5 mm and 20 mm. The dorsum surface is usually light white or yellowish, with small brown spots.

Distribution
This species occurs in the Red Sea and in the Indian Ocean off Chagos, Kenya, Madagascar, the Mascarene Basin, Mauritius, Mozambique, Réunion, the Seychelles, Somalia and Tanzania and off Australia (Northern Territory, Queensland, Western Australia).

Synonyms
Cypraea atomaria Gmelin, 1791 (original combination)
Cypraea punctata Linnaeus, 1771
Cypraea punctata punctata Linnaeus, 1771
Evenaria carula Iredale, 1939 (original combination)
Notadusta punctata (Linnaeus, 1771)
Notadusta punctata punctata (Linnaeus, 1771) · accepted, alternate representation
Palmadusta punctata (Linnaeus, 1771)
Palmadusta punctata atomaria (Gmelin, 1791)
Palmadusta punctata iredalei (Schilder & Schilder, 1938) (Synonym)
Ransoniella atomaria (Gmelin, 1791)
Ransoniella bulbosa Dolin, 2007
Ransoniella carula (Iredale, 1939)
Ransoniella erminea Dolin, 2007
Ransoniella fusula Dolin, 2007
Ransoniella glandina Dolin, 2007
Ransoniella iredalei (Schilder & Schilder, 1938)
Ransoniella labiosa Dolin, 2007
Ransoniella meyeri Dolin, 2007
Ransoniella oryza Dolin, 2007
Ransoniella persticta (Iredale, 1939)
Ransoniella punctata (Linnaeus, 1771)
Ransoniella radiosa Dolin, 2007
Ransoniella serrata Dolin, 2007
Ransoniella uvula Dolin, 2007
Ransoniella vulgata Dolin, 2007
Ransoniella zyzypha Dolin, 2007

References

 WoRMS
 Encyclopedia of Life
 Linnaeus, C. 1771. Mantissa Plantarum. Holmiae : Laurentii Salvii Holmiae Pts 1 & 2 588 pp..
 Drivas, J.; Jay, M. (1987). Coquillages de La Réunion et de l'Île Maurice. Collection Les Beautés de la Nature. Delachaux et Niestlé: Neuchâtel. . 159 pp
 Wilson, B. 1993. Australian Marine Shells. Prosobranch Gastropods. Kallaroo, Western Australia : Odyssey Publishing Vol. 1 408 pp. 
 Lorenz, F. & Hubert, A. 2000. A Guide to Worldwide Cowries. Hackenheim, Germany : ConchBooks pp. 1–584. 
 Meyer, C.P. 2003. Molecular systematics of cowries (Gastropoda: Cypraeidae) and diversification patterns in the tropics. Biological Journal of the Linnean Society of London 79: 401–459 
 Meyer, C.P. 2004. Toward comprehensiveness: increased molecular sampling within Cypraeidae and its phylogenetic implications. Malacologia 46(1): 127–156

External links
 
 
 Meyer, C. 2005. Notadusta punctata punctata Linnaeus, 1771. Cowrie Genetic Database Project. 2005.

Cypraeidae
Molluscs described in 1771
Taxa named by Carl Linnaeus